The Mature Age, also named Destiny, The Path of Life or Fatality (1894–1900) is a sculpture by French artist Camille Claudel. The work was commissioned by the French government in 1895, but the commission was cancelled in 1899 before a bronze was cast. A plaster version of the sculpture was exhibited in 1899, and then cast in bronze privately in 1902.  A second private bronze casting was made in 1913, and it is thought that the plaster version was destroyed at that time.  

The two bronzes are exhibited in Paris, the first at the Musée d'Orsay and the second at the Musée Rodin.

Background
Auguste Rodin had taken Camille Claudel on as a student in 1884, and she became his associate and lover.  He eventually refused to marry her, reluctant to end his long-term relationship with Rose Beuret, mother of his son and later his wife.  This love triangle, and an abortion, caused a separation between Claudel and Rodin in 1892, but they remained on reasonable terms until 1898.  Rodin tried to help Claudel through the agency of another person, and obtained an official commission for her from the Inspector of Fine Arts Armand Silvestre, in 1895, her first commission from the French state.  The evolution of the work can be judged from official reports made by Inspector Armand Dayot.

The final rupture between Claudel and Rodin came in 1898, when she moved away and opened her own studio.  The commission was cancelled in unusual circumstances in June 1899 by the Fine Arts Director, Henry Roujon.

Description

The work comprises three naked figures with swirling drapes:  a young woman kneeling has just released the hand of the second figure, an older standing man, and he is being drawn away by the embrace of the third person, an older woman.  It can be viewed as an allegory of ageing, the man leaving behind youth and progressing towards maturity and eventual death; but it can also be interpreted as reflecting Claudel's abandonment by Rodin: she is pleading with Rodin, but he has returned to Beuret. Claudel explained this symbolism in letters to her brother Paul Claudel, then consul in New York. According to her, the group represents Destiny. On the basis of these letters, The Mature Age can be considered an autobiographical work.

The older woman is identified by some with the Goddess of Fates Clotho (another Claudel sculpture represented the goddess in 1893) or Venus. The young woman that represents Youth has been exhibited as Le Dieu Envolé (The God Has Flown Away), which references the story of Psyche and Cupid, whose love is forbidden by Venus.
 
Rodin was shocked and angered when he saw the sculpture for the first time in 1899.  He cut off support for Claudel, and may have influenced the Ministry of Fine Arts to cancel their commission.

Evolution
The sculpture reflects work by Claudel from at least 1893.  A design from the end of 1893 is held by the Bibliothèque Nationale in Paris, and she referred to a "group of three" in a letter to her brother Paul in December 1893.  Claudel made a first plaster version of the sculpture in 1894-95, with three figures, one kneeling and two standing, in a more closed composition than the final version.  This first plaster version is held by the Musée Rodin.  It measures .

Claudel altered the composition to create a more dynamic second version, with two figures leaving the third behind.  The revised composition was completed in 1898, and exhibited in plaster in 1899 at the Salon of the Société Nationale des Beaux-Arts.

The initial project shows the man to be resistant to the old woman but in the second project, he simply allows himself to be led away. Paul Claudel opines that these are not "the two versions of the same event, but of two chapters of a single drama."

The bronze was also exhibited at the Salon of the Société Nationale des Beaux-Arts in 1902, and at the Société des Artistes Français in 1903. It was kept by Captain (later General) Tissier and his son André until 1982, when it was bought by the Musée d'Orsay. It measures  and weighs .

A second bronze was cast by Frédéric Carvilhani in 1913, and is exhibited at the Musée Rodin since donated by Paul Claudel in 1952.

The pleasing woman was known as The Vanished God in around 1905. It measures .

Paul Claudel, the artist's brother, commented on the work: "Ma soeur Camille, implorante, humiliée à genoux, cette superbe, cette orgueilleuse, et savez-vous ce qui s'arrache à elle, en ce moment même, sous vos yeux, c'est son âme". ("My sister Camille, imploring, humiliated on her knees, this great proud woman, and you know what is tearing at her, right now, before your eyes, it's her soul")

See also
List of sculptures by Camille Claudel

Notes

References
 Claudel, The Age of Maturity, Khan Academy 
 The Age of Maturity or Destiny or The Path of Life or Fatality, Musée Rodin
 L'Âge mûr ou la Destinée, ou Le Chemin de la vie, ou La Fatalité, Musée Rodin (French)
 L'Âge mûr, première version, Musée Rodin (French)
 L'Âge mûr, Musée Rodin (French)
 1893 -1908 : Period of solitary creation, Musée Camille Claudel
 L'Âge mûr, Musée Camille Claudel
 L'Age mûr [Maturity], Musée d'Orsay
 L'Age mur, Musée d'Orsay
 "Paradoxes de l'espace sculpté chez Camille Claudel", Silke Schauder, La clinique lacanienne 2008/2 (n° 14), pages 99 à 112 (French)
 From Rodin to Giacometti: Sculpture and Literature in France, 1880-1950, edited by Keith Aspley, Elizabeth Cowling, Peter Ssharratt, Peter Sharratt, p.45
 The Implorer (L'Implorante), modeled 1898, cast ca. 1905, Metropolitan Museum of Art
 "The genius of Camille Claudel", Apollo, Catherine Lampert 13 May 2017

External links

1899 sculptures
Sculptures by Camille Claudel
Plaster sculptures
1902 sculptures
Bronze sculptures in Paris
Sculptures of the Musée d'Orsay
Sculptures of the Musée Rodin